The New American Bible Revised Edition (NABRE) is an English-language Catholic translation of the Bible, the first major update in 20 years to the New American Bible (NAB), which was translated by members of the Catholic Biblical Association and originally published in 1970. Released on March 9, 2011, the NABRE consists of the 1986 revision of the NAB New Testament with a fully revised Old Testament approved by the United States Conference of Catholic Bishops in 2010.

Approved for private use and study by Catholics, the NABRE has not received approval for Catholic liturgical use. Although the revised Lectionary based on the original New American Bible is still the sole translation approved for use at Mass in the dioceses of the United States, the NABRE New Testament is currently being revised so that American Catholics can read the same Bible translation in personal study and devotion that they hear in Mass.

Scriptural sources
New Testament sources are predominantly "UBS3" and "NA26," as further explained below:

Sourcing: "The Greek text followed in this translation is that of the third edition of The Greek New Testament, edited by Kurt Aland, Matthew Black, Carlo Martini, Bruce Metzger, and Allen Wikgren, and published by the United Bible Societies in 1975 (UBS3). The same text, with a different critical apparatus and variations in punctuation and typography, was published as the twenty-sixth edition of the Nestle-Aland Novum Testamentum Graece (NA26) in 1979 by the Deutsche Bibelgesellschaft, Stuttgart. This edition has also been consulted. When variant readings occur, the translation, with few exceptions, follows the reading that was placed in the text of these Greek editions, though the occurrence of the principal variants is pointed out in the notes."

Old Testament Citations: "...Insofar as possible, the translation of such Old Testament citations agrees with that of The New American Bible Old Testament whenever the underlying Greek agrees with the Hebrew (or, in some cases, the Aramaic or Greek) text from which the Old Testament translation was made. But citations in the New Testament frequently follow the Septuagint or some other version, or were made from memory, hence, in many cases the translation in the New Testament passage will not agree with what appears in the Old Testament. Some of these cases are explained in the notes."

Old Testament major sources come by way of the New American Bible; specifically Biblia Hebraica Stuttgartensia, the Septuagint and the Dead Sea Scrolls. Other source details, such as Codex Sinaiticus, are as described below:

"Where the Old Testament translation supposes the received text—Hebrew, Aramaic, or Greek, as the case may be—ordinarily contained in the best-known editions, as the original or the oldest extant form, no additional remarks are necessary. Where the translators have departed from those received texts, e.g., by following the Septuagint rather than the Masoretic text, accepting a reading of what is judged to be a better textual tradition, as from a Qumran manuscript, or by emending a reading apparently corrupted in transmission, such changes are recorded in the revised edition of the Textual Notes on the New American Bible. Additional information on the textual tradition for some books may be found in the introduction to the book in the same Textual Notes.
 
"In particular, important manuscripts from Cave 4 of Qumran, as well as the most useful recensions of the Septuagint, have been consulted in the preparation of 1 and 2 Samuel. Fragments of the lost Book of Tobit in Aramaic and in Hebrew, recovered from Cave 4 of Qumran, are in substantial agreement with the Sinaiticus Greek recension used for the translation of this book. The lost original Hebrew text of 1 Maccabees is replaced by its oldest extant form in Greek. Judith, 2 Maccabees, and parts of Esther are also translated from the Greek. The translation of The Wisdom of Ben Sira is based on the original Hebrew as far as it is preserved, with corrections from the ancient versions; otherwise, the Greek of the Septuagint is followed. In the Book of Baruch the basic text is the Greek of the Septuagint, with some readings derived from an underlying Hebrew form no longer extant. In the deuterocanonical sections of Daniel (3:24–90; 13:1–14:42), the basic text is the Greek text of so-called Theodotion, occasionally revised according to the Greek text of the Septuagint."

Reasons for revision

In a press statement, the USCCB cited three reasons for the necessity of revising the Old Testament. The new translation:

Aims to utilize modern scholastic advances in biblical study and adapt to changes in linguistics in order to render a more accurate translation in contemporary English.
Takes advantage of recently discovered ancient manuscripts like the Dead Sea Scrolls which provide better access to the historical textual tradition. 
Uses the best manuscript-translating traditions available in order to translate more literally and accurately than previous translations.

The press statement says that the New American Bible Revised Edition will in many ways be a more literal translation than the original New American Bible.

Old Testament
In August 1990, the Catholic Biblical Association passed a resolution urging revision of the Old Testament of the New American Bible.

In November 2008, the Old Testament (including footnotes and introductions) was approved by the United States Conference of Catholic Bishops. However, they would not allow it to be published with the 1991 Psalms. A final revision of the NAB Psalter was undertaken using suggestions vetted by the Subcommittee for the Translation of Scripture Text and stricter conformity to Liturgiam Authenticam.

Psalms
The first revision of the Psalms in 1991 was rejected for liturgical use by the Congregation for Divine Worship and the Discipline of the Sacraments at the Vatican because of the extensive application of gender-neutral language in the text.

Throughout the new translation of the Psalms, the use of gender-neutral language has been limited and appropriate gender-specific pronouns used in conjunction with the original Hebrew.

Changes to vocabulary
One of the more important changes found in the New American Bible Revised Edition is the substitution of various words and phrases for language which carries a modern connotation which is quite different from the original suggested meanings. Examples include changing "cereal" to "grain" and "booty" to "plunder."

Examples

Similarly, "holocaust" has been changed to "burnt offering". The word "holocaust" in modern English has become used almost exclusively to refer to the genocide of the Jewish people during World War II. In order to capture the biblical meaning, the translators chose the phrase "burnt offering" to replace "holocaust" throughout the text in reference to sacrifices made to God.

Sample changes

Gender-neutral language
Vatican norms for translation of the Bible include that, "The translation of scripture should faithfully reflect the Word of God in the original human languages, without 'correction' or 'improvement' in service of modern sensitivities".

Horizontal gender-neutral language
According to a press backgrounder released by the USCCB, the New American Bible Revised Edition "reflects the original meaning of the texts. Much of the original material, especially in the narrative books, was gender specific and remains so."

Vertical gender-neutral language
Whereas horizontal non-gendered language is generally viewed as an understandable adaptation in light of modern gender sensitivity, "vertical" neutral language—any pronoun or referent to the Christian God—is considered a break from both tradition and Christian revelation. Catholic bishops in the United States have made it clear that any gender-neutral language in reference to any of the three persons of the Holy Trinity—Father, Son, or Holy Spirit—is unacceptable. According to the USCCB, "traditional masculine language for God...belongs to the deposit of divine revelation and may not be replaced [with gender-neutral or feminine language]."

Completion and use
In January 2011, the USCCB announced that the fourth edition of the NAB would be published on March 9 of that year. To be known as the "New American Bible, Revised Edition" or NABRE, the fourth edition of the NAB includes the newly revised Old Testament and re-revised Psalms, and the revised New Testament from the 1986 second edition. While the NABRE represents a revision of the NAB towards conformity towards Liturgiam Authenticam, there have not been any announced plans to use the NABRE for the lectionary in the United States. The USCCB announced the approval is for "private use and study" while Masses will continue to use a lectionary taken from "an earlier, modified version of the NAB translation."

Among press coverage on the release of the New American Bible Revised Edition on March 9, 2011 were interviews on local news channels, national news coverage by NPR and NBC, as well as a variety of articles by online journals and publications.

Future editions 

In 2012, the USCCB "announced a plan to revise the New Testament of the New American Bible Revised Edition so a single version can be used for individual prayer, catechesis and liturgy." After they developed a plan and budget for the revision project, work began in 2013 with the creation of an editorial board made up of five people from the Catholic Biblical Association (CBA). The revision is now underway and, after the necessary approvals from the Bishops and the Vatican, is expected to be done around 2025.

See also
 Catholic Bible
 Douay–Rheims Bible
 Divino afflante Spiritu
 Liturgiam authenticam
 International Commission on English in the Liturgy

References

External links 
 Meet the 'New' New American Bible 
 Q&A About the NABRE 
 U.S. Catholic Church Rolls Out New Bible Translation 
 Why do we need a new translation? The Bible hasn't changed, has it? 
NAB New Testament Revision Project [5]

Bible translations into English
2011 books
2011 in Christianity
Catholic bibles